Tolomako (also called Bigbay) is a language of the Oceanic subgroup of Austronesian languages. It is spoken on Santo island in Vanuatu.

Characteristics
It distinguishes four numbers for its personal pronouns: singular, dual, trial, plural. Its verbs have no tense or aspect marking, but two moods, realis and irrealis. Substantives and numerals also have the same two moods. E.g.

Tolomako proper is characterized by having dentals where the mother language had labials before front vowels. It shares this feature with Sakao, but not with its dialect Tsureviu, which is otherwise very close. Thus:

When labials do occur preceding front vowels they seem to be reflexes of older labiovelars:

Compare with Fijian ŋata "snake" (spelt gata).

It is possible that Tolomako is a very simplified daughter-language or pidgin of the neighboring language Sakao. However, Tolomako is more likely a sister language of Sakao, not a pidgin. It cannot be phonologically derived from Sakao, whereas Sakao can be from Tolomako to some extent. Comparing Tolomako with its close dialect of Tsureviu allows researchers to reconstruct an earlier state, from which most of Sakao can be regularly derived. This earlier state is very close to what can be reconstructed of Proto-Vanuatu. Thus Tolomako is a very conservative language, whereas Sakao has undergone drastic innovations in its phonology and grammar, both in the direction of increased complexity.

Phonology

Tolomako has a simple syllable structure, maximally consonant-vowel-vowel: V, CV, VV, CVV. However, in older materials, it permitted closed syllables, such as kanam "you (exclusive)" versus kanamu.

Deixis
There are three degrees of deixis, here/this, there/that, yonder/yon.

Nouns
Tolomako has inalienably possessed nouns, which are regularly derived:

Syntax
Tolomako syntax is isolating. It has a single preposition, ne, for all relationships of space and time; below it is used to distinguish the object of a verb from the instrument used.

Literature
Tolomako was unwritten until the arrival of missionaries from the New Hebrides Mission.  James Sandilands translated Matthew, Jonah and Malachi from the Bible into Tolomako and these were published as "Na taveti tahonae hi Iesu Kristo, Matiu moulia..." by the British and Foreign Bible Society in 1904. A missionary with the New Hebrides Mission, Charles E. Yates translated the book of Acts into Tolomaku and this was published by the Melbourne Auxiliary of the British and Foreign Bible Society in 1906.

Charles E. Yates then worked on the Gospel of John, the Letter to the Philippians and the 1st and 2nd Letters to Timothy.  With the help of fifteen of his teaching staff they translated "Na Taveti Tahonai hi Jon na Varisula" and 750 copies were published by the British and Foreign Bible Society in 1909.

See also
Sakao language, for parallels to the above in a closely related but grammatically more complex language

References

External links
A 1992 mailing list message from Jacques Guy, describing some of his fieldwork on the language
A 1994 message from Jacques Guy, citing Tolomako as a counterexample to the thesis that all languages are equally complex

Espiritu Santo languages
Languages of Vanuatu
Definitely endangered languages